Saxe is a surname. Notable people with the surname include:

Adrian Saxe (born 1943), American ceramist
David B. Saxe (born 1942), American judge
David Saxe (born 1969), American theatrical producer
Edward Saxe (1916–2002), War intelligence, CBS executive, MOMA director, New York Harvard Club President
John Godfrey Saxe (1816–1887), American poet
John Godfrey Saxe II (1877–1953), American politician
John Theodore Saxe (1843–1881), of Albany Academy
Karen Saxe, American mathematician
Kenneth E. Saxe, (born 1962), American technology pundit, Congressional Twenty-First Century Workforce Commission member
Martin Saxe (1874–1967), New York politician
Maurice de Saxe (1696–1750), military figure, Marshal General of France
Melinda Saxe (born 1965), American magician
Rebecca Saxe, MIT neuroscientist
Susan Edith Saxe (born 1949), one of the FBI's Ten Most Wanted Fugitives in the first half of the 1970s

See also
Sax (surname)
Sachs
Sacks (surname)
Saks (surname)